Robert John Montague Chadwick (16 October 1879 – 11 March 1939), sometimes known as Monty Chadwick, was a New Zealand sportsman. He played first-class cricket for Otago and Hawke's Bay.

Chadwick was born at Dunedin in 1879. He worked as an engineer and played association football for Otago and for the New Zealand national football team.

References

External links
 

1879 births
1939 deaths
New Zealand cricketers
Hawke's Bay cricketers
Otago cricketers
Cricketers from Dunedin